
Gmina Malczyce is a rural gmina (administrative district) in Środa Śląska County, Lower Silesian Voivodeship, in south-western Poland. It is part of the Wrocław metropolitan area.

Neighbouring gminas
Gmina Malczyce is bordered by the gminas of Prochowice, Ruja, Środa Śląska, Wądroże Wielkie and Wołów.

Villages
The gmina contains the villages of Chełm, Chomiąża, Dębice, Kwietno, Malczyce, Mazurowice, Rachów, Rusko, Szymanów, Wilczków and Zawadka.

References

Malczyce
Środa Śląska County